The Shap Stone Avenue (an unofficial name) is a megalithic complex near Shap in Cumbria, England, comprising stone circles, a two-mile avenue (actually two avenues) of stones, and burial mounds.

Location
Shap Stone Avenue is one of three major complexes of megalithic monuments to be found in east Cumbria. The stone circles, henges, cairns and other standing stones in the area are often grouped at nodes of communication routes - the monuments around Shap form an 'avenue' running to the east of the River Lowther along a main route to the north; the Long Meg complex runs alongside the River Eden; Mayburgh Henge and the other henges run alongside the River Eamont near its confluence with the River Lowther.

Some stones have been lost, some natural erratics may have been added to the monument in historical times, and the various early accounts of the setting by William Stukeley, Thomas Pennant, Lady Lonsdale and George Hall are not easy to reconcile.

However, the avenue may be seen in the context of the valley in which it is placed. Clare pointed out that the view to the east is restricted, that there may have been a tarn close to the site, and that the southern terminus of the lines of stones may have ended at a stream. There may also have been a spring within the complex. All of these features are similar to ones found at the Long Meg and Mayburgh complexes as well. The Shap complex has stone circles and cairns to the east of it such as the Hardendale Stone Cairn, Castle Howe, Seal Howe and Oddendale.

In addition, the northern focus of some of the stones of Shap Avenue 'north' appears to be a burial mound at Skellaw Hill, the southern focus of some of the stones of Shap Avenue 'south' also seems to be a burial mound or mounds.

The avenue
The actual arrangements of the original stones in the avenue(s) can no longer be determined (at least without excavation). Clare suggests that there were two avenues; one consisting of a single, more widely spaced, row to the west and north west of Skellaw Hill, and one of two rows, as Burl suggests, or a double row, more closely spaced, as Clare suggests, leading from a now lost stone circle at Carl Lofts (near the Greyhound Hotel), to the southern circle at Kemp Howe. The two avenues form an arc to the west of Shap village roughly moving in a north-north-west to south-south-east direction. He points out that the geological composition (pink granite) of the major, pyramidal-shaped stones (Goggleby Stone, Thunder stone) differs from that of the other boulders in the complex.

Traces of eight stones mark the avenue which led in a northwest direction from the Kemp Howe stone circle.

From north to south, the following major features may be seen:

The Thunder Stone
The avenue's first major stone is the massive Thunder Stone which is located 3 km northwest of the Kemp Howe stone circle, and is just to the north-west of Skellaw Hill.
This stone was not set into the ground, but lies on the surface left by the retreating ice, so "may not thus be a part of the constructed avenue".

Skellaw Hill barrow
The avenue passes by the Skellaw Hill barrow, also known as the Hill of Skulls or Skellow Hill,, a round burial mound. It is located 2.4 km northwest of the Kemp Howe stone circle.

Asper's Field Stone
The Asper's Field Stone is a massive boulder on private land, about nine feet high by five feet wide, that has fallen on to its side. It has two cup markings on the top, one with a single ring around it.

Goggleby Stone
The Goggleby Stone is the next one to be seen, just south of Asper's Field. It is located in a field down a back road between Keld and Shap. The Goggleby Stone is about ten feet high and has a cup mark on its north face, and an artificial shallow depression above it. The Goggleby stone had fallen, but was re-erected by Tom Clare, the County Archaeologist, after having excavated it.

South Shap stone circle (Kemp Howe)
The remains of the stone circle lie on the A6 road opposite the former petrol station close to a railway embankment. The stone circle is badly damaged, the Victorian railway-builders having driven their line right through the circle itself, and only six pink granite stones remain in place. All of the stones are fallen. They once formed a circle with a diameter of about 14 metres.

Dating and purpose
Clare suggests that the avenues date to the Late Neolithic period (approximately 3,000-2,000 BC), based upon the evidence supplied by the Goggleby Stone excavation mentioned above.

Clare also points out that the Shap complex is important because of the lack of a henge or large stone circle (as at Mayburgh or Long Meg). The layout, with its similarities to the other two complexes, plus the choice of pink granite for the large stones, suggests a similar ritualistic rationale behind the monument, perhaps extending over several generations.

Notes

External links

Shap Community Website: the Avenue, with map
Megalithic Portal: Shap Avenue
The Modern Antiquarian: Shap Avenues

Megalithic monuments in England
Stone circles in Cumbria
Archaeological sites in Cumbria
Shap